Middlefield is a town in Hampshire County, Massachusetts, United States. The population was 385 at the 2020 census. It is part of the Springfield, Massachusetts Metropolitan Statistical Area.

History 
Middlefield was first settled in 1780 and was officially incorporated in 1783.

Geography

Demographics

As of the census of 2000, there were 542 people, 213 households, and 161 families residing in the town.  The population density was 22.4 people per square mile (8.7/km).  There were 263 housing units at an average density of 10.9 per square mile (4.2/km).  The racial makeup of the town was 98.89% White, 0.18% African American, 0.18% Native American, 0.18% from other races, and 0.55% from two or more races. Hispanic or Latino of any race were 0.55% of the population.

There were 213 households, out of which 28.6% had children under the age of 18 living with them, 66.7% were married couples living together, 5.2% had a female householder with no husband present, and 24.4% were non-families. Of all households 17.4% were made up of individuals, and 6.1% had someone living alone who was 65 years of age or older.  The average household size was 2.54 and the average family size was 2.86.

In the town, the population was spread out, with 23.1% under the age of 18, 5.9% from 18 to 24, 31.2% from 25 to 44, 30.3% from 45 to 64, and 9.6% who were 65 years of age or older.  The median age was 40 years. For every 100 females, there were 103.8 males.  For every 100 females age 18 and over, there were 101.4 males.

The median income for a household in the town was $50,938, and the median income for a family was $53,889. Males had a median income of $35,208 versus $30,375 for females. The per capita income for the town was $24,137.  About 7.3% of families and 8.6% of the population were below the poverty line, including 9.2% of those under age 18 and none of those age 65 or over.

Government
The town is part of the First Franklin District in the Massachusetts House of Representatives, represented by Natalie Blais, and the Berkshire, Franklin, Hampshire and Hampsen Senate district, represented by Adam Hinds.

Notable people

 Israel Bissell, Patriot post rider
 Elijah Churchill, Revolutionary War hero, recipient of one of the three Purple Hearts Washington presented
 Ebenezer Emmons, geologist
 Martha Stewart, businesswoman and television hostess

Sites of interest
 Glendale Falls 
Glendale Brook provides one of Massachusetts' most impressive waterfalls. The brook eventually feeds into the Westfield River, which has been federally designated as a Wild and Scenic River. The Glendale Falls site itself is part of the Glendale Falls Reservation.
 Middlefield Fair
The Middlefield Fair, a small country-style fair, established in 1855, is hosted annually by the Highland Agricultural Society, and is held in August over three days. The 2013 event was the 158th occurrence.   There are many events for attendees of all ages, including tractor pulls, pie eating contests, and agricultural contests.

See also
Gateway Regional School District

References

External links 

 MHC Survey Reconnaissance Town Report: Middlefield, Massachusetts Historical Commission, 1982.

Towns in Hampshire County, Massachusetts
Springfield metropolitan area, Massachusetts
Towns in Massachusetts